Westminster Congregational Church was an historic Congregational church at 3600 Walnut Street in Kansas City, Missouri.

The church was started in 1904 and was added to the National Register in 1980.

References

Churches on the National Register of Historic Places in Missouri
Gothic Revival church buildings in Missouri
Churches completed in 1904
Churches in Kansas City, Missouri
National Register of Historic Places in Kansas City, Missouri